KRAB (106.1 FM, "Alt 106.1") is a commercial alternative rock music radio station in Greenacres, California, broadcasting to the Bakersfield, California, area.  The station is owned by iHeartMedia, Inc.  Its studios are located in southwest Bakersfield, and its transmitter is located east of Bakersfield in rural Kern County.

History
This station's history began on June 26, 1987, when a construction permit was issued, which called for a new radio station at 106.3 FM. On July 8 of that year, broadcast authorities instituted the KRAB call letters to the construction permit. The station was founded by Atmosphere Broadcasting LP, which applied for its license in late 1990. KRAB finally signed on on March 29, 1991. Several years later the station changed frequencies and began broadcasting at 106.1.

In October 2000, Clear Channel Communications (now iHeartMedia) acquired the station. This station was placed into the Aloha Station Trust in 2008, with iHeartMedia substantially reacquiring the station in 2014. This station is a distant sister to KYSR in nearby Los Angeles.

Previous logo

Sources

External links
106.1 KRAB official website

Modern rock radio stations in the United States
Radio stations established in 1991
RAB
IHeartMedia radio stations